Passers By is a 1920 American silent romantic drama film directed by J. Stuart Blackton and starring Herbert Rawlinson, Leila Valentine and Ellen Burford. It was based on a 1911 West End play of the same title by C. Haddon Chambers, which had previously been made into the 1916 film Passers By.

Synopsis
In England a young man falls in love with the governess to his stepsister's children. When she discovers about the potential relationship she does her best to sabotage it due to her snobbish attitudes.

Cast
 Herbert Rawlinson as 	Peter Waverton
 Leila Valentine as 	Margaret Summers
 Ellen Burford as 	Beatrice Dainton 
 Pauline Coffyn as 	Lady Hurley
 William J. Ferguson as 	Pine, the Butler
 Tom Lewis as Nighty
 Dick Lee as Burns
 Charles Stuart Blackton as 	Little Peter

References

Bibliography
 Connelly, Robert B. The Silents: Silent Feature Films, 1910-36, Volume 40, Issue 2. December Press, 1998.
 Goble, Alan. The Complete Index to Literary Sources in Film. Walter de Gruyter, 1999.

External links
 

1920s American films
1920 films
1920 romantic drama films
1920s English-language films
American silent feature films
Silent American drama films
American black-and-white films
Films directed by J. Stuart Blackton
Pathé Exchange films
American films based on plays
Films set in London
Remakes of American films
American romantic drama films